Aline Systems, Inc. (styled ALINE) designs, develops and sells suspension insoles and the "ALINEr", a device that claims to use simple mechanics and a laser to measure lower leg and ankle alignment before and after the footbeds are fitted and customized.

The company was founded in Marblehead, Massachusetts in 2005 by Gordon Hay, Keith Orr, and Derek Carroll.  Product sales began in New England in January 2006.  As of January 2008, the company has a United States account base in running, golf, cycling, winter sports and outdoor sports.

The technology evolved from working for two decades making custom orthotics for advanced skiers, snowboarders and mountain climbers.  

The company's ostensible goal was to build that knowledge into an engineered product that would be available to the masses and provide optimal alignment to users without disrupting natural biomechanics.

Sports 
Aline footbeds are used by numerous professional athletes in running, triathlons, skiing, snowboarding and golf.  These include skiers Micah Black, Sarah Burke, Brian Bennett, Ian McIntosh, and Jamie Pierre; professional snowboarders Ross Powers, Seth Wescott, Andy Finch, and Molly Aguirre; and professional golfers D. J. Trahan, Rory Sabbatini, Kirk Hanefeld, and Phyllis Meti.

References 
 Lewon, Dennis, "Full Suspension", Outside, February 2007
 Tuff Dunn, Sarah, "Sole Patrol," Seven Days, Burlington, Vermont, September 27, 2006
 PGA magazine, September 2006, p. 107

External links 
 

Shoemaking
Anthropometry